In the early years of Delta Tau Delta, chapter names were assigned, removed, and reassigned in rapid succession. There are at least two incidents of the same name being issued simultaneously. Other chapters selected names and began operating without authorization from the national fraternity; some were eventually authorized, while others were dispatched. Because all records from Alpha Prime were lost and Alpha Third was lax in record keeping and ended in scandal, there are gaps in information, especially from 1858 to 1875.

flor;In 1877, James Eaton constructed a multi-part history of the fraternity for the Crescent magazine from his memory as the founder of multiple chapters, from the fraternity's records, and interviews with living chapter founders. He documented chapters and name changes that were unknown to William Raimond Baird when he published the first edition of his  Baird's Manual of American College Fraternities in 1879. For example, Baird lists Mount Union College as Sigma Second but does not list Sigma Prime or the two other Sigma chapters that predated Mount Union. Baird also lists charter dates, but leaves the institution's name blank in some instances. Eaton often fills in those blanks, but tends to list institutions by place name only which presents a different set of challenges.

This list is a merger of Eaton, Baird, and other sources. Active chapters are indicated in bold. Inactive chapters are in italic. Chapters are located in the United States unless otherwise indicated. The chapters are listed in Greek alphabet order, but can be sorted to date order by using the arrows in the section header.

Chapters

Notes

References 

Lists of chapters of United States student societies by society
Delta Tau Delta